Donovan Jay Hand (born April 20, 1986) is an American former professional baseball pitcher. He played in Major League Baseball (MLB) for the Milwaukee Brewers and Cincinnati Reds and in the Chinese Professional Baseball League (CPBL) for the Brother Elephants.

Early career

Milwaukee Brewers
Hand graduated from Hatton High School in Town Creek, Alabama and played college baseball at Jacksonville State University in Jacksonville, Alabama. He was drafted by the Brewers in the 14th round of the 2007 amateur entry draft. That year, he split time playing for their Rookie League Helena Brewers and Class A West Virginia Power. Hand split the 2008 season between the Class A-Advanced Brevard County Manatees and Double-A Huntsville Stars and continued with the Stars in 2009. In 2010 and 2011, Hand split his time between Huntsville and the Triple-A Nashville Sounds. In 2012, he stuck with the Sounds until being called up to the Brewers during the 2013 season.

Hand made his MLB debut on May 26, 2013. And made his first career start on June 22, 2013. Hand threw 4 2/3 scoreless innings, and teammates Burke Badenhop, John Axford, Michael Gonzalez, and Francisco Rodriguez secured the shut out. Rodriguez notched the save, for save number 300 in his career. After appearing in 31 games (7 of those being starts), He was designated for assignment on February 7, 2014 to make room for Francisco Rodriguez on the 40-man roster and was later optioned to Triple-A. As of July 21, 2014, Hand is 1-6 with a 5.44 ERA in 39 appearances all in relief for the Nashville Sounds.

Cincinnati Reds
On January 15, 2015, Hand signed a minor league deal with the Cincinnati Reds.

Brother Elephants
Hand signed with the Brother Elephants of the Chinese Professional Baseball League for the 2016 season.

New York Mets
In March 2017, Hand signed a minor league contract with the New York Mets. He elected free agency on November 6, 2017.

References

External links

1986 births
Living people
People from Town Creek, Alabama
Baseball players from Alabama
Major League Baseball pitchers
Milwaukee Brewers players
Cincinnati Reds players
Jacksonville State Gamecocks baseball players
Helena Brewers players
West Virginia Power players
Brevard County Manatees players
Huntsville Stars players
Nashville Sounds players
Caribes de Anzoátegui players
Louisville Bats players
Somerset Patriots players
Las Vegas 51s players
Binghamton Rumble Ponies players
American expatriate baseball players in Taiwan
Brother Elephants players
American expatriate baseball players in Venezuela